Willie Moore was an Irish hurler and Gaelic footballer. His championship career with the Cork senior teams as a dual player lasted from 1915 until 1919.

Moore made his debut with the Cork senior team during the 1915 championship and went on to become a regular member of the team at various times over the following few years. During this time he won his sole All-Ireland medal. Moore also won two Munster medals as a hurler, while he also won a Munster medal as a Gaelic footballer.

Honours

Cork
All-Ireland Senior Hurling Championship (1): 1919
Munster Senior Hurling Championship (2): 1915, 1919
Munster Senior Football Championship (1): 1916

References

UCC hurlers
Cork inter-county hurlers
Cork inter-county Gaelic footballers
Year of birth missing
Year of death missing